DZSP (864 AM) Sonshine Radio is a radio station owned and operated by Sonshine Media Network International. The station's studio and transmitter are located at 9001 St. Francis Ave., Farconville Subd. Phase 1, Brgy. San Francisco, San Pablo, Laguna.

References

Christian radio stations in the Philippines
Radio stations established in 1966
Sonshine Media Network International
Radio stations in Laguna (province)